Gannet Island may refer to: 

 Kārewa / Gannet Island, New Zealand 
 Gannet Island (Western Australia) 
 Gannet Islands Ecological Reserve, NE Canada  
 Motutākupu / Gannet Island, part of the Motukawao Islands, New Zealand